The age of the oldest known stars approaches the age of the universe, about 13.8 billion years. Some of these are among the first stars from reionization (the stellar dawn), ending the Dark Ages about 370,000 years after Big Bang. These are recognized as among the oldest individual stars observed so far:

Footnotes

References
 

Oldest